Karina Testa (born 5 August 1981) is a French actress. She appeared in more than twenty films since 2001 including the lead role in Frontier(s).

Selected filmography

References

External links 

1981 births
Living people
French film actresses